Handle Hall is a Grade II listed privately owned historic house in Littleborough, Greater Manchester.

History 
In 1610, Richard Dearden (d.1630) built the house he originally called ‘Warcock Hill’ but the name was subsequently changed to Handle Hall. Several of Richard Dearden’s descendants owned the house, including his son John Dearden (1655–87), grandson James Dearden (1682–1749), and James Dearden (1774–1828) who purchased the manorial rights and became Lord of the manor of Rochdale.

Architecture 
The present house is an 1820 rebuild of the 1610 house, with a barn added in the 1840s. It has ogee shaped lintels and hoodmoulds, double-chamfered mullion windows, and a door lintel stating "A.S. 1610 Richard Dearden Struxit, 1820 Jacobus Domum De Novo Restituit".

See also
Listed buildings in Littleborough, Greater Manchester

References 

Listed buildings in Greater Manchester
Buildings and structures in the Metropolitan Borough of Rochdale
Buildings and structures in Rochdale